The 1984 IIHF European U18 Championship was the seventeenth playing of the IIHF European Junior Championships.

Group A
Played in Rosenheim, Garmisch-Partenkirchen, Füssen and Bad Tölz, Bavaria, West Germany, from April 7–13, 1984.

First round
Group 1

Group 2

Final round 
Championship round

Placing round

The Netherlands were relegated to Group B for 1985.

Tournament Awards
Top Scorer  Igor Vyazmikin (16 points)
Top Goalie: Jaroslav Landsmann
Top Defenceman:Mikhail Tatarinov
Top Forward: Alexander Semak

Group B
Played in Herning, Denmark, from March 26 to April 1, 1984.

First round
Group 1

Group 2

Final round 
Championship round

Placing round

Norway was promoted to Group A and Italy was relegated to Group C, for 1985.

Group C
Played in Edinburgh and Kirkcaldy, Scotland, United Kingdom from April 21–27, 1984.

Hungary was promoted to Group B for 1985.

References

Complete results

Junior
IIHF European Junior Championship tournament
April 1984 sports events in Europe
1983–84 in West German ice hockey
Sports competitions in Bavaria
1984 in Bavaria
Sport in Garmisch-Partenkirchen
Rosenheim
March 1984 sports events in Europe
Sport in Herning
International ice hockey competitions hosted by Denmark
1983–84 in Danish ice hockey
International ice hockey competitions hosted by the United Kingdom
International sports competitions in Edinburgh
1980s in Edinburgh
Kirkcaldy
1983–84 in British ice hockey
Ice hockey competitions in Scotland
International ice hockey competitions hosted by West Germany